The Aito M7 is a range extended electric SUV sold from 2022 under the Aito brand and produced by Chinese car manufacturer Seres.

History 

The Aito M7 is a premium 6-seater vehicle with 3 rows. The second row comes with Zero Gravity Seats which unfolds to offer a more comfortable position for passengers. Aito claims that by bringing knees and hips to the same level and ensuring the angle between thighs and torso is precisely at 113 degrees could improve the blood circulation. Sound system of the M7 is provided by Huawei and comes with 19 speakers in 7.1 surround sound setup.

Mechanics 
The Aito M7 is based on the modified platform design of the Fengon ix7 which also shares the same platform as the Fengon 580. The rear-wheel-drive version of the Aito M7 has a 1.5-litre turbocharged range extender with up to 90W power and a 200kW electric motor. The four-wheel-drive model adds a 130kW front motor for greater traction and can accelerate from 0 to 100km/h in 4.8 seconds with the combined output of 449 hp and 660 Nm. 

The rear-wheel-drive Aito M7 has a battery that offers a range of 195km compared to the 165km of the four-wheel-drive model. Combined, the rear-wheel model has a range of 1,220km on full fuel and full charge. The four-wheel-drive M7 model delivers an overall range of 1,100km.

References

External links
Official website

Aito M7
Mid-size sport utility vehicles
2020s cars
Cars introduced in 2022
Cars of China